Cyanonilutamide (developmental code name RU-56279) is a nonsteroidal antiandrogen which was never marketed. Both RU-56187 and RU-58841 appear to be prodrugs of cyanonilutamide in vivo in animals. It has relatively low affinity for the androgen receptor but nonetheless shows significant antiandrogenic activity in animals.

See also
 5N-Bicalutamide
 Nilutamide
 RU-56187
 RU-58642
 RU-59063

References

Abandoned drugs
Human drug metabolites
Imidazolines
Nitriles
Nonsteroidal antiandrogens
Trifluoromethyl compounds